Hodge Creek flows into the Black River near Bushes Landing, New York.

References 

Rivers of New York (state)